Wayne's World 2: Music from the Motion Picture is the soundtrack album for the 1993 comedy sequel film  Wayne's World 2. It features two live tracks from Aerosmith, and a version of "Louie, Louie" by Robert Plant.

Track listing
"Louie, Louie" - Robert Plant
"Dude (Looks Like a Lady)" - Aerosmith*
"Idiot Summer" - Gin Blossoms
"Superstar"  - 'Superfan' (a collective including Chrissie Hynde on vocals and the musicians from Urge Overkill)
"I Love Rock 'n' Roll" - Joan Jett & the Blackhearts
"Spirit in the Sky" - Norman Greenbaum
"Out There" - Dinosaur Jr.
"Mary's House"  - 4 Non Blondes
"Radar Love" - Golden Earring
"Can't Get Enough" - Bad Company
"Frankenstein" - Edgar Winter
"Shut Up and Dance" - Aerosmith*
"Y.M.C.A." - Village People ('uncredited hidden track on some releases')

An asterisk (*) indicates live performances from the movie

Charts

Certifications

References

Comedy film soundtracks
1993 soundtrack albums
1990s film soundtrack albums
Reprise Records soundtracks
Wayne's World